Wylie Island is a bar island on the New River in Summers County, West Virginia.  It is located at Mile 20 near the very upstream end of Bluestone Lake.

Under normal conditions the island is above water, but it is subject to flooding during high water events in the Bluestone Lake pool.  In drought conditions, the channel separating the island from the left-descending bank of the river sometimes dries up.

See also
Bluestone Lake Wildlife Management Area

References

External links
Bluestone Lake Wildlife Management Area website

River islands of West Virginia
Landforms of Summers County, West Virginia